The North Hollywood Amelia Earhart Regional Library (also referred to as the Amelia Earhart Branch Library), which was formerly known as the North Hollywood Branch Library, is a branch library in the Los Angeles Public Library system, located in the North Hollywood area of Los Angeles, California.  It was built in 1930 based on a Mediterranean Revival design by architects Weston & Weston.

Architecture 
The North Hollywood Amelia Earhart Regional Library is a single-story building featuring a double roof of red tile. The upper roof hangs over a clerestory, with seven windows placed over the main entrance of the building. These windows are framed by a pair of coat-of-arms belonging to the family of poet Sidney Lanier. The lower roof is supported by cement columns and hangs over office space as well as a patio leading to the main entrance.

The interior of the library, meanwhile, features an open-beamed ceiling and a large fireplace. Written over this in tile are the words "I am a small-winged bird, but I can conquer the world," by Sidney Lanier. The chimneys for this fireplace are located on the south side of the upper roof. The main circulation desk is placed in the center of the building.

All later additions to the library utilized the same building materials wherever possible and made efforts to retain the overall style of the original structure.

History

Founding and renaming
The North Hollywood Amelia Earhart Regional Library began as the Lankershim Public Library in the early 1900s, located on Margate Street. In 1923, Lankershim was annexed by the City of Los Angeles. Four years later, the neighborhood changed its name to North Hollywood, and consequently, the library was renamed the Sidney Lanier Branch, in keeping with the then tradition of naming all Los Angeles branch libraries after famous literary figures. In 1929, the library was moved to its current location on Tujunga Avenue, the new building being designed by the architects Louis Eugene Weston and Louis Eugene Weston Junior.

Following World War II, usage of the library increased greatly, due in large part to the massive growth experienced by Los Angeles during that time. In 1956, architect John James Landon was commissioned to design an addition to the library to accommodate the influx of patrons. The resulting addition nearly doubled the library's size and included a new children's area. Care was taken to match the existing design and style utilized by Weston & Weston during the library's initial construction.

In 1980, community members requested that the library be renamed to honor famed aviator Amelia Earhart, who had lived in the North Hollywood area and was known for her love of books. This was deemed especially appropriate in light of the statue of Earhart adjacent to the library. Following a poll of the community, the motion to rename the library was passed by the Library Board of Commissions, and in 1981, the name change was enacted. Following this, several pieces of memorabilia of the pilot were placed inside the library, including photographs and a scarf that belonged to her.

Northridge Earthquake and reconstruction
In 1994, the library was one of many structures damaged by the Northridge Earthquake. The library was closed for repairs for a year following the quake, during which time M2A architects were commissioned to carry out repairs. Most of the repairs were funded by the "Adopt-a-Branch" program, which allows for private or corporate sponsors to supplement the funding of a branch of the Los Angeles Library. In the case of the North Hollywood Amelia Earhart Regional Library, MCA/Universal were the primary contributors. The library officially reopened on April 17, 1995.

Historic designations and awards

The North Hollywood Amelia Earhart Regional Library was classified as a Los Angeles Historic-Cultural Monument in 1986.

In 1987, the North Hollywood Amelia Earhart Regional Library and several other branch libraries in Los Angeles were added to the National Register of Historic Places as part of a thematic group submission. The application noted that the branch libraries had been constructed in a variety of period revival styles to house the initial branch library system of the City of Los Angeles.

In 2003, the library received the Governor's Historic Branch Preservation Award and the Los Angeles Conservancy Preservation Award for the renovations carried out by M2A architects.

In 2004, the California Preservation Foundation also awarded M2A with the Preservation Design Award.

See also

List of Registered Historic Places in Los Angeles
 List of Los Angeles Historic-Cultural Monuments in the San Fernando Valley
Los Angeles Public Library

References

External links
 North Hollywood Amelia Earhart Regional Library - Los Angeles Public Library

Libraries in Los Angeles
North Hollywood, Los Angeles
Buildings and structures in the San Fernando Valley
Mediterranean Revival architecture in California
Los Angeles Historic-Cultural Monuments
Libraries on the National Register of Historic Places in Los Angeles
National Register of Historic Places in the San Fernando Valley
Monuments and memorials to Amelia Earhart
Library buildings completed in 1930
1930 in California